Notre Dame School (NDS) Devanagari नोट्रे डम स्कुल बन्दिपुर ) is a high school located in Bandipur, Nepal. The school was founded by the School Sisters of Notre Dame (SSND), a congregation of Roman Catholic sisters founded in Bavaria in 1833 and devoted to educating students at all levels around the world.

NDS was opened in Bandipur in 1985 as a kindergarten school by SSND sisters from Japan and was soon developed into a primary school. The first batch of students completed the 10th grade (which is considered the end of high school and beginning of college education in Nepal) in 1996. In 1997, NDS started offering higher secondary education (dubbed the 10-plus-2 program) in Science under the Higher Secondary Education Board of Nepal.

Needy students from local villages were offered scholarships. The teachers of NDS were mostly Nepalese, but often included Indian nationals and European, American and Japanese volunteers. NDS was considered one of the best schools in Nepal, with an excellent track record in the School Leaving Certificate (SLC) examination (a national examination for 10th graders that marks the culmination of high school education, NDS was shut down due to constant threats from the Maoists of Nepal. The school has now been reopened.

References

Schools in Nepal
Educational institutions established in 1985
School Sisters of Notre Dame schools
1985 establishments in Nepal